The 2021–22 Akron Zips men's basketball team represented the University of Akron during the 2021–22 NCAA Division I men's basketball season. The Zips, led by fifth-year head coach John Groce, played their home games at the James A. Rhodes Arena in Akron, Ohio as members of the Mid-American Conference. They finished the season 24–10, 14–6 in MAC play to finish a tie for third place. As the No. 4 seed, they defeated Buffalo, Toledo, and Kent State to win the MAC tournament. They received the conference’s automatic bid to the NCAA tournament as the No. 13 seed in the East Region, where they lost in the first round to UCLA.

Previous season
In a season limited due to the ongoing COVID-19 pandemic, the Zips finished the 2020–21 season 15–8, 12–6 in MAC play to finish in a tie for third place. They defeated Bowling Green in the quarterfinals of the MAC tournament before losing to Buffalo in the semifinals.

Roster

Schedule and results

|-
!colspan=9 style=|Exhibition

|-
!colspan=9 style=| Non-conference regular season

|-
!colspan=9 style=| MAC regular season

|-
!colspan=12 style=| MAC tournament

|-
!colspan=12 style=|  NCAA tournament

References

Akron Zips men's basketball seasons
Akron
Akron Zips men's basketball
Akron Zips men's basketball
Akron